Georgia competed at the 2015 European Games, in Baku, Azerbaijan from 12 to 28 June 2015.

Medalists

Archery

Georgia has qualified for three quota places in both the women's archery events at the Games and one individual place in the men's, and as a result has also qualified for the women's and mixed team events.

Gymnastics

Artistic
 Women's individual – 1 quota place

Rhythmic
Georgia has qualified one athlete after the performance at the 2013 Rhythmic Gymnastics European Championships.
 Individual – 1 quota place

Trampoline
Georgia qualified two athletes based on the results at the 2014 European Trampoline Championships.
 Men's individual – 1 quota place

References

Nations at the 2015 European Games
European Games
2015